Dorstenieae is a tribe within the plant family Moraceae. The tribe includes eight genera and about 120 species.

Genera
Bleekrodea
Bosqueiopsis
Brosimum – Breadnut
Bosqueiopsis
Broussonetia
Dorstenia
Fatoua
Helianthostylis
Malaisia
Scyphosyce
Sloetia
Trilepisium – Urnfigs
Trymatococcus
Utsetela

References

Moraceae
Rosales tribes